Hanns Kneifel (11 July 1936, Gleiwitz – 7 March 2012, Munich) was a German science fiction writer. He is best known for writing 98 Perry Rhodan episodes.

References

External links

1936 births
2012 deaths
People from Gliwice
German science fiction writers
German male writers